The 2011 Coastal Carolina Chanticleers football team represented Coastal Carolina University in the 2011 NCAA Division I FCS football season. The Chanticleers were led by ninth-year head coach David Bennett and played their home games at Brooks Stadium. They are a member of the Big South Conference. They finished the season 7–4, 3–3 in Big South play to finish in a tie for third place.

Schedule

References

Coastal Carolina
Coastal Carolina Chanticleers football seasons
Coastal Carolina Chanticleers football